Reset is the ninth studio album by Latin Christian artist Luis "Funky" Marrero, released January 2011 on Funkytown Music.

Background
On a musical hiatus, Funky had many songs that were not released or songs that could have been tweaked. So he finally decided to put these all on one album, while he also recorded new material for the album.

Songs
"Hoy" & "Corazones Puro" were the first two songs to come out of the album as singles, but when they were finally released, they came out with a new mix and a new sound.

Track listing

Personnel
Produced by: Luis "Funky" Marrero, Orlando Rodriguez, Orlando Quest Mendez

Release history

External links
 http://www.funkytownmusic.com
 http://www.the2plus5team.com

2011 albums